Hjortsberg is a Swedish surname. Notable people with the surname include:

Cecilia Hjortsberg (born 1973), Swedish opera singer
Hedda Hjortsberg (1777–1867), Swedish ballerina
Lars Hjortsberg (1772–1843), Swedish actor
William Hjortsberg (1941–2017), American writer
An area in the Swedish town Falkenberg.

Swedish-language surnames